The Puppetoon Movie is a 1987 animated film written, produced, and directed by Arnold Leibovit. It is based on the Puppetoons characters created by George Pal in the 1930s and 1940s which feature the eponymous Puppetoon animation, and features Gumby, Pokey and Arnie the Dinosaur, who host the framing story. Its framing story stars the voices of Dick Beals, Art Clokey, Paul Frees and Dallas McKennon as the main characters.

The original 1987 release of The Puppetoon Movie contained 11 Puppetoons. The 2000 DVD release included 9 additional Puppetoons and the 2013 Blu-ray release added 7 more.

In 2020, The Puppetoon Movie Volume 2 was released on Blu-ray and DVD, featuring 17 shorts not included on any of the Puppetoon Movie releases and The Ship of the Ether.

Plot
The film opens on a film set, where Gumby and his friends are filming a dinosaur movie. A ferocious Tyrannosaurus rex named Arnie charges on set and is about to devour a young doe named Barbara when suddenly, he removes his false teeth and lets the doe go out of sympathy. Gumby as a director cuts the scene and questions Arnie on his hesitation to act ferocious. Although Arnie knows it is all just acting, he feels unfit for the part because it just isn't him. He explains that he once was ferocious, but thanks to the influence of George Pal, he has reformed and is now a vegetarian without a bad bone in his body. Gumby fails to understand the profound effect of George Pal on Arnie's persona, so Arnie and Pokey show Gumby a set of George Pal shorts to show him the significance of the artist, thus starting The Puppetoon Movie.

A number of George Pal's short films are featured in the film: 
 The Little Broadcast
 Philips Broadcast of 1938
 Hoola Boola 
 South Sea Sweethearts 
 The Sleeping Beauty 
 Tulips Shall Grow° 
 Together in the Weather 
 John Henry and the Inky-Poo °
 Philips Cavalcade 
 Jasper in a Jam
 Tubby the Tuba°

°Oscar nominated film

After all the shorts, Gumby and the others meet other characters who George Pal animated, such as the Pillsbury Doughboy and the Alka-Seltzer mascot Speedy. Gumby then thanks George Pal for making all this possible, and everybody cheers. The screen pans out and shows a gremlin, from the 1984 film Gremlins who looks at the audience, says "George Pal!" in a raspy voice, then climbs up a support beam while laughing hysterically.

Home video
In addition to the film shorts listed above, the following Pal film shorts are also included in the 2000 DVD edition from Image Entertainment and the 2013 Blu-ray edition from B2MP: What Ho She Bumps, Mr. Strauss Takes a Walk, Olio for Jasper,  Jasper's Derby, Ether Symphony, Aladdin and the Magic Lamp, The Magic Atlas, Jasper and the Haunted House,  and The Ship of the Ether.

The 2013 Blu-ray also includes the following short films previously unavailable on home video (all of which sublicensed by Puppetoons' original distributor Paramount): The Oscar-nominated And to Think That I Saw It on Mulberry Street, The 500 Hats of Bartholomew Cubbins, Sky Princess, Rhapsody in Wood, Date with Duke, Jasper and the Beanstalk, and Rhythm in the Ranks. In addition, the Blu-ray also includes The Great Rupert which was produced by George Pal and the documentary The Fantasy Film Worlds of George Pal.

A DVD edition from B2MP was released in 2013.

Reception
The film received mixed to positive reviews.

Awards
George Pal's Puppetoon body of work was recognized by a Special Oscar at the 16th Academy Awards in 1944. Pal received the Special Oscar "for the development of novel methods and techniques in the production of short subjects known as Puppetoons".

References

External links
 
 
 Arnold Leibovit on THE PUPPETOON MOVIE
 The Puppetoon Movie Volume 2 60 Second Trailer
 The Puppetoon Movie Volume 2 website

1987 films
1987 animated films
1980s American animated films
American fantasy comedy films
Films directed by Arnold Leibovit
Puppet films
Animated anthology films
1980s stop-motion animated films
Animated films about dinosaurs
Puppetoons
Short films directed by George Pal
1987 fantasy films
Films scored by Buddy Baker (composer)
1980s English-language films